Tafjordfjella or Tafjordfjellene is a mountain range in Møre og Romsdal and Innlandet counties, Norway. It is located in the municipalities of Fjord, Stranda, Rauma, and Skjåk. The area takes its name from the village of Tafjord and the Tafjorden, the main entry point.

Lakes in the area include Tordsvatnet, Veltdalsvatnet, Zakariasdammen, and Grønvatnet. Part of the range is included inside Reinheimen National Park.

The Norwegian Trekking Association has the cabins called Reindalsseter, Pyttbua, Veltdalshytta, Vakkerstøylen, and Danskehytta. The western part of the area has since 1923 been extensively developed for hydro-electric power production by the Tafjord Kraft company.

See also
List of mountains of Norway

References

External links
Sensasjonelle steinalderfunn i høgfjellet [Senastional stone age finds, high in the mountains]

Mountain ranges of Norway
Fjord (municipality)
Stranda
Skjåk
Rauma, Norway
Landforms of Møre og Romsdal